Fernando Enrique Mayans Canabal (born 5 April 1963) is a Mexican politician affiliated with the Party of the Democratic Revolution. He currently serves as Senator of the LXII Legislature of the Mexican Congress representing Tabasco. He also served as Deputy during the LXI Legislature, as well as a local deputy in the Congress of Tabasco.

References

1963 births
Living people
Members of the Senate of the Republic (Mexico)
Members of the Chamber of Deputies (Mexico)
Party of the Democratic Revolution politicians
21st-century Mexican politicians
Members of the Congress of Tabasco
Senators of the LXII and LXIII Legislatures of Mexico